Maurepas is a commune in the Yvelines department in the Île-de-France region in north-central France. It is located in the western suburbs of Paris  from the center.

History
Most ancient buildings are the ruins of the donjon, built in the 11th century and destroyed in 1425.

There is also near St Sauveur's church, dating from the 15th century.

In 768, the French king Pepin the Short offered the village of Maurepas (formerly spelled Malrepast) and its wooden keep to the Abbey of Saint-Denis. Facing the Normans' invasions, they left the domain to the Lords of Chevreuse. The castle and village were given to the family of Malrepast, a vassal of the Lords of Chevreuse, which gave its name to the village.

In 1432, during the Hundred Years' War, the English conquered the village and destroyed the keep.

After the war, the domain of Maurepas returned to the family of Chevreuse, but the castle remained a ruin.

Jean-Frédéric Phélypeaux from the Phélypeaux family, was Count of Maurepas. He was living in the next city of Jouars-Pontchartrain in the Château de Pontchartrain.

People
who lived in Maurepas
 Erich von Stroheim - (1885 - 1957), Austrian-American actor, film director, producer born in Vienna, Austria, died at his home in Maurepas from cancer.

Transportation
Maurepas is served by no station of the Paris Métro, RER, or suburban rail network. The closest station to Maurepas is La Verrière station on the Transilien La Défense and Transilien Paris – Montparnasse suburban rail lines. This station is located in the neighboring commune of La Verrière,  from the town center of Maurepas.

Demography

Education
Junior high schools:
 Collège Alexandre Dumas
 Collège Louis Pergaud
 Collège de la Mare aux Saules in nearby Coignières

Senior high schools/sixth-form colleges:
 Lycée des 7 Mares
 Lycée Dumont d'Urville

Twin towns
It is twinned with Waterlooville in Hampshire, and Tirat Carmel in Haifa district, Israel.

See also
 Communes of the Yvelines department

References

External links

 Official website 

Communes of Yvelines